Open government principles are an integral part of anti-corruption policy and governance reforms implemented in the Republic of Azerbaijan. Two National Action Plans on Promotion of Open Government were adopted with Presidential Decrees respectively in 2012 and 2016.

Even though the Republic of Azerbaijan joined Open Government Partnership in 2011, its National Strategy on Increasing Transparency and Combating Corruption adopted in 2007 specifically included several measures aimed at the promotion and development of OGP principles. Vusal Huseynov and Kamal Jafarov served as the national focal point of the Open Government Partnership international initiative.

The establishment of ASAN Service (one-stop-shop service hall) in Azerbaijan is an example of the implementation of OGP commitments. ASAN Service received UN Public Service Award in 2015.

National Action Plan for the Promotion of Open Government (2012-2015) 
National Action Plan for the Promotion of Open Government is the main strategic document defining the strategic course of measures to be carried out in the country during a given period, as well as establishing the sequence and the direction of the measures to be conducted in the coming years.

In this document, the Government has mobilized all necessary resources for the execution of the National Action Plan. The purpose of the National Action Plan, which covered the years of 2012-2015 was to ensure the duration of the measures carried out in Azerbaijan in the field of combating corruption, increasing transparency in the activity of state bodies, ensuring compliance of administration with modern standards of management, and promotion of the principles of Open Government.

National Action Plan guided by the principles of Open Government Partnership outlines measures for public authorities on providing broad public information about its activities, as well as the role of civil society in the decision-making process, the expansion of electronic services and the improvement of quality of services provided to the population.

Commission on Combating Corruption of the Republic of Azerbaijan, which is in charge of collecting and reviewing reports of responsible state bodies, noted that 82% of measures envisaged in the National Action Plan were implemented by the governmental institutions. It is noted in the final assessment report that public authorities fully implemented the measures regarding the simplification of the access to information, provision of regular information to the public on the work of the government agencies and improving e- services.

Furthermore, the number of services provided through the e-government portal increased, opportunities for the “ASAN payment” system expanded and “ASAN service” index was created to assess the quality of public services. The governmental agencies improved the citizen grievances’ review rules and the geographic coverage of the services provided by “ASAN service” centres were expanded.

Public councils were set up under governmental institutions, public discussions and hearings were held, and closer involvement of civil society institutions in the work of governmental agencies was assured. The projects and initiatives implemented by government agencies to promote open government were outlined and support was provided to the civil society institutions involved in this area.

The national chapter of Transparency International regularly conducted independent monitoring of NAP with the financial support of USAID. TI-Azerbaijan concluded that the final implementation rate for NAP was 76%.

Drafting process of National Action Plan (2016 -2018) 
The drafting process of the new National Action Plan on Promotion of Open Government for the years 2016-2018 commenced on 25 October 2015. The drafting process lasted for 6 months with inclusive and close involvement of international organizations, civil society organizations, media and state bodies.
The national chapter of Transparency International noted that 40% of their recommendations were reflected in the adopted version of the National Action Plan. It is also mentioned that new National Action Plan project incorporates the results of the assessment of the implementation of the previous National Action Plan, problems encountered during the implementation process and their remedies, as well as all measures necessary to establish transparent and accountable governance mechanisms in Azerbaijan in line with the Open Government principles.

National Action Plan for the Promotion of Open Government (2016-2018) 
National Action Plan was approved with the Presidential Decree on 27 April 2016. Open Government Initiative Government and Civil Society Dialogue Platform noted that the adoption of the “National Action Plan for the years 2016-2018 on Open Government Initiative” and the scope of the measures to expand open government principles and prevent corruption were an indication of the political will of Azerbaijan.

Establishment of Open Government Dialogue Platform 
On 9 September 2016 “Open Government Partnership Dialogue Platform” was established to strengthen the cooperation, communication and partnership among state bodies and civil society organizations and to contribute further expansion of OGP principles/values in Azerbaijan. Memorandum was signed by participating parties which defined the functions and objectives of the Platform and its charter was adopted. 10 state bodies, including the Anti-Corruption Commission and Ministry of Justice, whose activity specifically relates to civil society organizations, parliament and 31 NGOs established the platform.

Application of new innovation in the monitoring of National Action Plans 
Commission on Combating Corruption, with support of the project of “Strengthening capacities to fight and prevent corruption in Azerbaijan” implemented by Council of Europe and funded by European Union, launched new “Electron Monitoring System”. New system simplifies and expedites the submission of progress reports by state bodies tasked with carrying out specific measures under National Action Plan and facilitates reviewing and monitoring by the Commission on Combating Corruption.

State bodies, through the new e-portal www.ems.gov.az, are sending progress reports including images, videos and other relevant documents for each and specific measures envisaged in National Action Plan. Contact points from each state body are interacting with each other and Anti-Corruption Commission in the online form. In addition to that, contact points can publish information about carried out or planned events on their activities on e-portal. This practice encourages other state bodies to learn and follow best practices of other state bodies. Another caveat of this e-platform is that the OGP Platform will be given access to this system and they will be able to do independent monitoring of the National Action Plan without applying to state bodies. Azerbaijan is the first country in the region to apply an e-monitoring system in the evaluation of the National Action Plan. The OGP Steering Committee resolved to extend Azerbaijan’s inactive status in OGP by one year.

See also 
 ASAN service
 Commission on Combating Corruption
 Open Government Partnership
 Azerbaijan Anti-Corruption Academy

References 

Open government
Open government by location